Michael Owen Guy Ridley (born July 8, 1963) is a Canadian former professional ice hockey centre who played in the NHL for 12 seasons from 1985 until 1997.

Ridley signed with the New York Rangers as an undrafted free agent in September 1985. Ridley played 866 career games, scoring 292 goals and 466 assists for 758 points. His best offensive season was the 1988–89 season, when playing with the Washington Capitals, he scored 41 goals and 89 points, both career highs.

He scored the first Canuck goal ever in General Motors Place, the home of the Vancouver Canucks.

Career statistics

Awards and achievements 
MJHL First All-Star Team (1983)
MJHL Scoring Champion (1983)
MJHL Goal Scoring Leader (1983)
GPAC First All-Star Team (1984 and 1985)
GPAC MVP (1984)
CIAU All-Canadian (1984 and 1985)
Canadian University Player of the Year (1984)
NHL All-Rookie Team (1986)
Played in NHL All-Star Game (1989)
"Honoured Member" of the Manitoba Hockey Hall of Fame
Mike Ridley Trophy named in his honor; awarded annually to the MJHL's top scorer

External links

1963 births
Living people
Canadian ice hockey centres
Manitoba Bisons ice hockey players
National Hockey League All-Stars
New York Rangers players
St. Boniface Saints (ice hockey) players
Ice hockey people from Winnipeg
Toronto Maple Leafs players
Undrafted National Hockey League players
Vancouver Canucks players
Washington Capitals players